The 1990 Thomas & Uber Cup was the 16th tournament of the Thomas Cup, and the 13th tournament of the Uber Cup, which are the major international team competitions in world badminton. The 1990 final stage was held in Tokyo, Japan, in May 1990.

Host city selection
Singapore, Japan and South Korea submitted bids to host the tournament. The host selection was decided in May 1988, in Kuala Lumpur, at the same time with the 1988 Thomas & Uber Cup. At the general meeting, Tokyo, Japan, was selected to host the tournament.

Thomas Cup

Teams
53 teams took part in the competition, and eight teams qualified for the Final Stage, including China, as defending champions, and Japan, as the host team.

Final stage

Group A

Group B

Knockout stage

Final round

Uber Cup

Teams
42 teams took part in the competition, and eight teams qualified for the Final Stage.

Final stage

Group A

Group B

Knockout stage

Final

References

Smash: 1990 Thomas Cup - Challenge Round

External links
 Mike's Badminton Populorum - Uber Cup
 Mike's Badminton Populorum - Thomas Cup 

Thomas & Uber Cup
Thomas Uber Cup
Thomas Uber Cup